Tab Wilson Perry (born January 20, 1982) is a former American football wide receiver. He was drafted by the Cincinnati Bengals in the sixth round of the 2005 NFL Draft. He played college football at UCLA.

Perry has also been a member of the Miami Dolphins.

Early years
Perry played wide receiver and safety at Milpitas High School wearing the jersey number 3.

College career
During his first three seasons at UCLA, played wide receiver and wore the jersey number 1 (because number 3 was already taken).  He worked hard over the summer, attending classes at three small schools in between his junior and senior year, to remain eligible to play football at UCLA.  Once it was vacated, he wore the number 3 for his senior year.

Professional career

Cincinnati Bengals
Perry was expected to go somewhere around the third to fifth round of the 2005 NFL Draft, but fell to the Bengals in the sixth round.  Most teams saw him primarily as a kick returner, because that was his specialty at UCLA (where he set numerous records).  He wore the number 12 during preseason for the Bengals and during a short minicamp due to the late graduation date of UCLA.

Perry was used primarily as a kick returner for his first year with the Bengals.  He earned special teams player of the week in a victory over the Pittsburgh Steelers due in part to a long kick return that set up the game clinching touchdown. He was listed from as high as the third down to the fifth receiver for Cincinnati.

Perry finished the 2005 season with a franchise record 1,562 kickoff return yards, and 2 touchdowns on offense, assisting the team to an 11-5 record and their first playoff appearance in over a decade.  Perry was also the starting returner for the Bengals in 2006, but he suffered a season-ending injury in the second game of the year.

Miami Dolphins
On March 15, 2008, Perry signed a one-year deal worth just under $1 million with the Miami Dolphins. On May 24, he suffered a torn Achilles' tendon. He was waived/injured by the Dolphins four days later and subsequently placed on injured reserve.

Las Vegas Locomotives
Perry was signed by the Las Vegas Locomotives of the United Football League on August 31, 2009.

External links
 UCLA Bruins bio
 Just Sports Stats

1982 births
Living people
Sportspeople from Wilkes-Barre, Pennsylvania
Players of American football from Pennsylvania
American football wide receivers
American football return specialists
UCLA Bruins football players
Cincinnati Bengals players
Miami Dolphins players
Las Vegas Locomotives players